Proprioseiopsis exitus is a species of mite in the family Phytoseiidae.

References

exitus
Articles created by Qbugbot
Animals described in 1966